The Jory series consists of very deep, well-drained soils that formed in colluvium derived from basic igneous rock. These soils are in the foothills surrounding the Willamette Valley of the United States. They are named after Jory Hill, Marion County, Oregon, which itself is named for the Jory family, who settled in the area in 1852, after traveling along the Oregon Trail.

Surface layer:  organic material
Subsurface layer:  dark reddish brown silty clay loam
Subsoil - upper:  dark reddish brown clay
Subsoil - lower:  red clay

Jory soils generally support forest vegetation, dominantly Douglas fir and Oregon white oak. They are very productive forest soils. Many areas have been cleared and are used for agricultural crops. The Jory soils and the climate of the Willamette Valley provide an ideal setting for the production of many crops, including Christmas trees, various berries, filberts (hazelnuts), sweet corn, wheat, and many varieties of grass seed.  The soils are suitable for the grapes used in the expanding Oregon wine industry.

Growing urbanization of the Willamette Valley is resulting in a great deal of pressure for development in areas of the Jory soils.

Oregon state soil
After several failed attempts to make it an official state symbol, Jory was officially adopted as the state soil of Oregon by the Oregon Legislative Assembly in 2011.

See also
Pedology (soil study)
Soil types
List of U.S. state soils

References

Pedology
Soil in the United States
Geology of Oregon
Types of soil
Symbols of Oregon